"I'm Restless" is a song by Jennifer Warnes originally released in December 1979.

Status Quo cover 

"Restless" is a single released by the British Rock band Status Quo in 1994. It was included on the album Thirsty Work.

Track listing

7 inch vinyl / Cassette 
 "Restless" (J Warnes) (4.08)
 "And I Do" (Rossi/Frost/Macannany) (3.53)

2CD set

CD1 
 "Restless" (Orchestral Version) (J Warnes) (4.10)
 "Something 'Bout You Baby (I Like)" (R Supa) (2.50)
 "Caroline" (Rossi/Young) (3.43)
 "Burning Bridges" (Live) (Rossi/Bown) (3.56)

CD2 
 "Restless" (LP Version) (J Warnes) (4.08)
 "And I Do" (Rossi/Frost/Macannany) (3.53)
 "Democracy" (Leonard Cohen) (4.21)

Charts

References 

Status Quo (band) songs
1994 singles
Songs written by Jennifer Warnes
1979 songs
Jennifer Warnes songs